Rule #1 is a 2008 Hong Kong horror film directed by Kelvin Tong and starring Shawn Yue, Ekin Cheng, Stephanie Che and Fiona Xie.

Plot
While on duty during an assignment, police sergeant Lee Kwok-keung shot and killed Chan Fuk-loi, a serial killer, after Chan crippled his four limbs. When Lee woke up in hospital 49 days later, the police refused to recognise his testimony because it contained information about the supernatural. His superior then transferred him to the Miscellaneous Affairs Department so that he would be on light duty.

Unlike the heroic duty of fighting crime and protecting citizens, the Miscellaneous Affairs deals with unusual cases, which is intriguing and makes people feel lost. The head of the Miscellaneous Affairs, Inspector Wong Yiu-fai, is an eccentric and beer-guzzling man. Wong and Lee work together for the Miscellaneous Affairs to solve an unusual request: to eliminate the fear of every citizen seeking help. While carrying out their duties, Wong pretentiously tells Lee the first commandment of the Miscellaneous Affairs: There are no ghosts in this world! In fact, this first commandment is just a lie. The primary task for the Miscellaneous Affairs of dealing unusual cases is to conceal supernatural incidents to the community to reduce social panic.

Just when Wong and Lee take over the case of the Saint Austina High School massacre, Chan Fuk-loi's ghost possesses Lee's wife, May, while Lee was also possessed later. The possessed Lee shoots and kills Wong and other colleagues and then makes up his own story to deceive the police.

Cast

Awards and nominations
2008 Puchon International Fantastic Film Festival
Won: Best Actor (Shawn Yue, Ekin Cheng)
Nominated: Best of Puchon (Kelvin Tong)
2009 Singapore International Film Festival
Won: Silver Screen Award for Best Singapore Film (Kelvin Tong)

See also
Ekin Cheng filmography

References

External links

Rule #1 at Hong Kong Cinemagic

Rule #1 film review at LoveHKFilm.com

2008 films
2008 horror films
Hong Kong supernatural horror films
Police detective films
Hong Kong ghost films
2000s mystery horror films
2000s supernatural horror films
2000s Cantonese-language films
Films set in Hong Kong
Films shot in Hong Kong
2000s Hong Kong films